Melinda Henshaw (born 1 February 1977 in Christchurch, Canterbury, New Zealand) is a New Zealand yachtswoman.

She competed for New Zealand  at the 2000 Summer Olympics in Sydney, with Jenny Egnot in the Women's Double Handed Dinghy (470) class. They finished in 11th place.

External links
 Biography at the official New Zealand Olympic Committee website
 
 
 

1977 births
Living people
New Zealand female sailors (sport)
Sailors at the 2000 Summer Olympics – 470
Olympic sailors of New Zealand